DataSplice, LLC is a mobile software company headquartered in Fort Collins, Colorado that offers mobile applications which extend enterprise systems, including packaged software for Enterprise Asset Management (EAM) and computerized maintenance management systems (CMMS). The software provides an interface from these systems to handhelds, smartphones, tablet computers, and mobile computers. It may also be used on a desktop system as a unified/simplified interface for multiple systems.

The software offered is a mobile middleware, with an emphasis on IBM's Maximo EAM system. Its primary client base is focused on utilities, gas/oil, defense, aerospace and other markets which utilizes field service management systems which require tracking, asset management and regulatory accountability.

DataSplice does not use a proprietary software platform, but rather utilizes the Common Language Infrastructure (CLI) of Microsoft.NET framework’s ADO.NET, which allows for connectivity to different database systems such as MySQL and Oracle. The extensible system consists of three components, including a remote client (for handheld and/or desktop use), a server which communicates with the primary EAM, and an administration client for configuring the system.

History
Founded in 1991 as Optimization Resources, DataSplice was spun off as both a company and product in 2001. The original management and development staff continue to be engaged in daily operations. DataSplice is a privately held company.

DataSplice was acquired by Prometheus Group in 2018.

Products
The product's main emphasis is providing a simplified mobile interface into IBM Maximo. The product consists of three components: Remote Client, Administration Client, and the Server. The primary modules are Inventory, Work Orders, Inspections, Condition Monitoring and Asset Management.

The product's remote client is HTML5 compliant, and as such is platform agnostic. Supported systems include iOS (iPad), Android (Droid), and Windows Mobile and 8 (Surface, Phone and Desktop). The remote client is also able to utilize bar code scanners, mobile printers, and RFID readers.

In 2010, DataSplice introduced InspecTMI, a field inspections and operator rounds mobile collection system geared toward highly regulated inspection scenarios, such as substations, power generation, and safety inspections.

References

Enterprise architecture
Mobile technology
Business software
Data